Gallus (the cockerel) was a constellation introduced in 1612 (or 1613) by Petrus Plancius.

It was in the northern part of what is now Puppis. It was not adopted in the atlases of Johannes Hevelius, John Flamsteed and Johann Bode and fell into disuse.

See also
Obsolete constellations

External links
 http://www.ianridpath.com/startales/gallus.htm

Former constellations
Constellations listed by Petrus Plancius
Dutch celestial cartography in the Age of Discovery
Astronomy in the Dutch Republic
1610s in the Dutch Republic